The 2010 Champion Hurdle was a horse race held at Cheltenham Racecourse on Tuesday 16 March 2010. It was the 80th running of the Champion Hurdle.

The winner was J. P. McManus's Binocular, a six-year-old gelding trained in Berkshire by Nicky Henderson and ridden by A. P. McCoy. The victory was Henderson's fifth in the race, following See You Then (1985, 1986, 1987) and Punjabi (2009) and a third for McCoy, who had won in 1997 on Make A Stand and 2006 on Brave Inca.

Binocular, who had finished third when favourite for the previous year's race, won by three and a half lengths from Khyber Kim. Punjabi was the only previous Champion Hurdler in the field. All twelve of the runners completed the course. Binocular's win was controversial as Henderson had said in February that the horse would not run in the race. Khyber Kim's trainer Nigel Twiston-Davies said in 2014: "We won the Champion Hurdle four years ago but the horse who was taken out of the race, Binocular, turned up again".

Race details
 Sponsor: Smurfit Kappa
 Purse: £370,000; First prize: £210,937
 Going: Good to Soft
 Distance: 2 miles 110 yards
 Number of runners: 12
 Winner's time: 3m 53.80

Full result

 Abbreviations: nse = nose; nk = neck; hd = head; dist = distance; UR = unseated rider; PU = pulled up

Winner's details
Further details of the winner, Binocular.
 Sex: Gelding
 Foaled: 5 April 2004
 Country: France
 Sire: Enrique; Dam: Blue Ciel et Blanc (Pistolet Bleu)
 Owner: J. P. McManus
 Breeder: Élie Lellouche

References

Champion Hurdle
 2010
Champion Hurdle
Champion Hurdle
2010s in Gloucestershire